The 1990 Georgian Cup was the forty-seventh season overall and first since independence of the Georgian annual football tournament.

First qualifying round 

|}

Second qualifying round 

|}

Third qualifying round 

|}

Round of 64 

|}

Round of 32 

|}

Round of 16 

|}

Quarterfinals 

|}

Semifinals 

|}

Final

See also 
 1990 Umaglesi Liga
 1990 Pirveli Liga

References

External links 
 The Rec.Sport.Soccer Statistics Foundation.
 es.geofootball.com 

Georgian Cup seasons
Cup
Georgian Cup, 1990
Georgian Cup, 1990